The Nat are a sunni Muslim community found in North India. A few are also found in the Terai region of Nepal. They are Muslim converts from the Hindu Nat caste.

History and origin

The Muslim Nat are a semi-nomadic community, traditionally associated rope dancing, juggling, fortune telling and begging. They are found mainly in the districts of Madhubani, Darbhanga, Samastipur and Patna. They speak Urdu.

Present circumstances 

The Muslim Nat are mainly cattle dealers, while a small number are involved in begging. They are one of the most marginalized Muslim communities in Bihar. Almost all the Nat are landless. A small number of Nat have now settled down and are cultivators.

The Nat are strictly endogamous, and generally live in isolation from other Muslim communities in their neighbourhoods. Although they are Sunni Muslims, they incorporate many folk beliefs.

In Uttar Pradesh, the Nat are said to have come originally from Chittaur in Rajasthan. They are found mainly in the districts of Varanasi, Allahabad, Barabanki and Jaunpur. The Nat speak Urdu and Hindi and converted to Islam during the rule of the Nawabs of Awadh, about two hundred years ago. The Muslim Nat consist of number of sub-groups, the main ones being the Aman, Goleri, Mahawat, Rari, Siarmaroa and Turkata. Many Nat are still involved with fortune telling and live a semi-nomadic lifestyle. Most Nat are now landless agricultural labourers, and are in depressed economic circumstances. The Nat are Sunni Muslims, but incorporate many folk beliefs.

In Haryana, they are found mainly in the districts of Faridabad, Gurgaon and Rohtak. They speak Haryanvi, and understand Hindi. Little is known about the circumstances of their conversion to Islam. Historically, the community in Haryana were rope dancers, jugglers and acrobats. The Nat consist of a number of exogamous clans, the main ones being the Dagariya, Sansebar, Baraike, Khoyareke, Paharike, Nangariye, Dhadhasiya, Palike, Jirmichya, Dangiya, Kotiya, Shirkarake, Dilwati, Occhluke, Rashidiya, and Badanke. The Nat are no longer involved in their traditional occupation, and are now largely landless agriculture workers, migrating to different places in search of employment. They are nominally Sunni, but practice many folk beliefs.

References

Dalit Muslim
Muslim communities of Bihar
Muslim communities of Uttar Pradesh
Social groups of Haryana